School of the Woods is an independent primary and secondary school located at Hilshire Village, Texas, United States in Greater Houston, with a portion of the school property in Spring Branch, Houston.  It offers educational programs from Early Childhood through 12th grade in a  Montessori environment. It is accredited by the Southern Association of Colleges and Schools (SACS), and the Texas Alliance of Accredited Private Schools (TAAPS). The school holds a full level membership in the American Montessori Society (AMS).

School of the Woods is an independent, non-sectarian, Texas non-profit corporation.

In addition to its academic curricula, the school offers athletic and performing arts programs such as basketball, volleyball, soccer, instrumental music, dance, and drama.

Location
The main office mailing address is 1321 Wirt Road, Houston, Texas 77055. While the school has a Houston address, the school campus straddles Wirt Road, with the high school on the property in Spring Branch and within the Houston city limits, and the other buildings inside the city limits of Hilshire Village.

History
School of the Woods was founded by Dr. Ernest Wood and his wife Hilda Wood who was also a scholar and writer. The first class for pre-Kindergarten began in September 1962. The original classes served early childhood. Elementary and upper elementary were added as the school grew. A middle school with 7th and 8th grades was added in 1984. In the Fall of 1999 a high school was added with the first graduating class in the Fall of 2003.

Early childhood/kindergarten
Children learn actively in this 2.5 – 6-year-old group. Exposure to a rich variety of experiences is a vital part of the curriculum since children of this age learn more easily and efficiently than at any other time of life.

Elementary
Children at this level (1st-3rd grades) widen their horizons through an expanding curriculum. Abundant materials foster optimum development of reading, spelling and writing skills. Math operations emphasize the understanding of process as well as accuracy in computations.

Upper elementary
Children of the upper elementary level (4th-6th grades) cross the bridge between learning by hands-on experiences and the abstract understanding of concepts. New thinking brings a growing sense of membership in society. Work on group projects, use of community resources (such as libraries and museums), and expansion in field study become important new elements in the curriculum.

Middle school
The 7th and 8th-grade years encompass a time of rapid growth and change in early adolescence. In response to the developmental needs of this age group, School of the Woods implemented a program that has become a model for other Montessori and public middle school programs.

High school

The Woods High School courses of study reflect an integration of the Texas requirements of essential elements, the newest research on the developmental needs of adolescents, the Montessori philosophy, the state of the art in current learning theory and the predictions of the skills needed for a productive life in the 21st century.

Notable alumni

Dorian Electra, Musician, film-maker, and visual artist
Kobe Bryant, NBA MVP and All-Star, Attended from 1982 to 1983

School membership(s) 
 American Montessori Society (AMS).
 National Association for the Education of Young Children.
 State or regional independent school association.

References

External links
 Official website of School of the Woods
 History of school

Private K-12 schools in Houston
Private K-12 schools in Harris County, Texas
Montessori schools in the United States
Spring Branch, Houston